Sport Clube Santo Antônio, commonly known as Sport Atalaia, is an amateur Brazilian football club based in Atalaia, Alagoas. The team withdrew from the Campeonato Alagoano in the 2015 season.

History
The club was founded on 13 July 2007. They finished as runners-up in the 2010 Campeonato Alagoano Second Level, losing the competition to CSA.

Stadium
Sport Clube Santo Antônio play their home games at Estádio Luís de Albuquerque Pontes. The stadium has a maximum capacity of 3,000 people.

References

Association football clubs established in 2007
Football clubs in Alagoas
2007 establishments in Brazil